The Book of Being is a novel by Ian Watson published in 1985.

Plot summary
The Book of Being is a novel in which the heroine Yaleen dies, goes mad, and then rewrites reality.

Reception
Dave Langford reviewed The Book of Being for White Dwarf #68, and stated that "The marathon effort of trilogy-writing is showing: for ages Watson's intellectual gearshift stays in neutral, but crashes into overdrive for the forty pages of Part Three (containing most of the plot). Strangely paced stuff from one of the few SF authors with a truly strange mind."

Reviews
Review by K. V. Bailey (1985) in Vector 126
Review by Chris Morgan (1985) in Fantasy Review, July 1985
Review by Don D'Ammassa (1987) in Science Fiction Chronicle, #89 February 1987

References

1985 British novels
British science fiction novels
Victor Gollancz Ltd books